NGC 4074 is a peculiar lenticular galaxy located 310 million light-years away in the constellation Coma Berenices. It was discovered by astronomer William Herschel on April 27, 1785 and is a member of the NGC 4065 Group.

NGC 4074 is classified as a type 2 Seyfert galaxy. It was first identified as a Seyfert in 1978.

Supermassive black hole
NGC 4074 has a supermassive black hole with an estimated mass of ( M☉).

See also
 List of NGC objects (4001–5000)

References

External links

4074
038207
Coma Berenices
Astronomical objects discovered in 1785
Lenticular galaxies
NGC 4065 Group
Peculiar galaxies
Seyfert galaxies
Discoveries by William Herschel